Pseudogobio esocinus is a species of cyprinid found in Japan, the Korean Peninsula, and China.

References

Pseudogobio
Fish described in 1846